Michael Leung Man-kin  (1938–2017) was a Hong Kong government official.

Early life
Leung was born in 1938. He attended Wah Yan College and studied at the University of Hong Kong, graduating with a BA in history in 1965. He also held a teaching certification.

Government career
Leung joined the civil service in 1965. He worked in the Home Affairs Department and Finance Branch, and was promoted to Secretary, Government Secretariat in 1988.

Leung served as the director of education and the secretary for transport in the Hong Kong government. He also served as secretary for education and manpower from 1993 to 1995, and as the Commissioner of the Independent Commission Against Corruption (ICAC) from 1996 to 1997.

In December 1996, as the Handover of Hong Kong approached, Leung announced that he would quit the ICAC, fuelling speculation that he was being forced out by chief executive-designate Tung Chee-hwa. In response, Leung stated that he was leaving for personal reasons, while Tung denied any involvement in Leung's departure.

References

1938 births
2017 deaths
Alumni of the University of Hong Kong
Government officials of Hong Kong